Claude Vivier (baptised as Claude Roger; 14 April 19487 March 1983) was a Canadian contemporary composer, pianist, poet and ethnomusicologist of Québécois origin. After studying with Karlheinz Stockhausen in Cologne, Vivier became an innovative member of the "German Feedback" movement, a subset of what is now known as spectral music. He was also among the first composers in either Europe or the Americas to integrate elements of Balinese music and gamelan in his compositions, alongside Lou Harrison, John Cage and fellow Québécois Colin McPhee.

Despite working at a slow pace and leaving behind a small oeuvre, Vivier's musical language is vast and diverse. His place in the spectral movement of Europe allowed for manipulations of the harmonic series, and led to music that incorporated microtones to replicate these frequencies; a compositional technique he would later refer to as the jeux de couleurs. He is also known for incorporating elements of serialism and dodecaphony, musique concrète, extended techniques, surrealism, traditional Québécois folk songs, and more. The themes of Vivier's pieces are largely seen as autobiographical – often centering around loneliness and ostracization, the search for love and companionship, and the voyaging of foreign lands. He used his personal experiences to advance an avant-garde style, having written multilingual vocal music and devising his so-called  (invented languages). He is considered to be among the greatest composers in Canada's history – György Ligeti would revere Vivier as, "the most important and original composer of his generation".

Vivier lived as an openly gay man until his sudden and brutal murder in Paris, France at the age of 34. His death became a cause célèbre in both Europe and North America, and he is considered one of the most high-profile victims of homophobic violence in contemporary history. He is seen by many to be a martyr for the historical struggles of the LGBT community.

Early life

Childhood

Claude Vivier is believed to have been born on 14 April 1948 in the vicinity of Montreal, Quebec, and was voluntarily placed in the orphanage of La Crèche Saint-Michel (no longer in operation) the same day by his mother. Her name, ethnicity, and origin, as well as that of Vivier's father, are unknown.

Vivier would posit in later years, however, that he was likely not of French Canadian heritage. He would often mythicize the story and heritage of his parents, at times telling people his family was German, Eastern European, Jewish, etc. His friend Philippe Poloni would relay, "he thought that his father was a conductor, or his mother was a musician, and they met in Montréal. Or something like that, something very romantic. He always said he spoke good German and good Italian because he had a natural connection with those two languages as he had some Italian and some Jewish German blood in his veins." He searched his whole life in the hope of finding his birth parents, to no avail. This frustration and the feeling of a hollow identity inspired many of his works, including Lonely Child (1980).

After receiving the young boy, he was given the name of "Claude Roger" by the Sœurs Grises who ran the orphanage, and subsequently baptised at the Église Saint-Enfant-Jésus. He was considered a mentally disabled child, as the nuns believed him to be "deaf and dumb". Apart from this, however, very little is known from his early life in the orphanage due to a lack of record-keeping; any learning disability he may have had went undiagnosed.

He was adopted at the age of two-and-a-half by the working class Vivier family from Mile End, with parents Armand and Jeanne (née Masseau), and their two biological children. The couple had suffered a miscarriage many years prior and were looking for a young girl to adopt, only to find each Montreal orphanage having just boys; it is unknown why Claude was chosen out of the many in Saint-Michel. He was a charismatic and excitable child, but his time in the large and strictly Catholic Vivier household was fraught with incidents. After Christmas of 1950, Claude was briefly brought back to the orphanage by the family for unspecified reasons, but was taken back in around half a year later in August 1951. He is reported to have learned to speak at the age of six, before which the family considered sending him to a mental institution.

At the age of eight, Vivier was raped by his adoptive uncle, Joseph. He revealed this to a priest during a routine confession, and the priest reportedly told the young Claude that he would not be forgiven unless he told his parents. Vivier's parents became infuriated after he eventually recalled the sexual assault, believing he was either lying or responsible for the whole ordeal. This caused a significant strain in their relationship, and Vivier would ultimately spend less and less time interacting with his family – Joseph's sexual abuse continued for years after. The family moved north to the suburb of Laval when Vivier was nine or ten, and frequently migrated from house to house as they continued to struggle financially. These near-constant moves depressed Vivier as he became evermore lonely, "I remember when I was a child and we moved house – I went around the streets looking for friends, but came back to the house with my head down, still with no friends."

Adolescence

At the age of thirteen, Vivier's parents enrolled him in boarding schools run by the Frères Maristae, a French Catholic organisation that prepared young men for a vocation in the priesthood. Vivier recalled poetry being his favourite course, being especially fascinated with the works of Arthur Rimbaud and Émile Nelligan. He also developed a strong interest in linguistics and historical literature, studying the mechanics of ancient Greek and Latin, which would later prove influential for his . His relatively high grades let him rise to the ranks of church postulant, and he began to develop a group of friends with similar interests. His grades were ranked the highest in a class of thirty-four at the Juvénat Supérieur Saint-Joseph, with a two-year average exam mark of eighty percent. Vivier's first documented poems, including Noël and the dada-inspired Not' petit bonheur (1965), date from this period.

Vivier discovered he was gay while attending classes and experiencing what he called "" towards his fellow male classmates. In 1966, at age of eighteen, he had come out to his friends and family, during a time when homosexual acts were still illegal and heavily frowned upon in Canada. He was subsequently expelled from the novitiate of Saint-Hyacinthe halfway through the school year; the reason given by the Frères Maristae being his "inappropriate behaviour" and a "lack of maturity", but it is generally accepted by music historians that Christian intolerance towards homosexuality was the legitimate reason. Vivier reportedly sobbed for hours after receiving the expulsion notice, believing his time with the Frères Maristae was the only time he was ever truly happy. He would, however, make no attempt to hide his sexuality from then onward.

First musical education

Vivier's first exposure to music was singing hymns in the family's church during mass; he would later recall an experience in a midnight Mass on Christmas Eve as a "revelation". His adoptive parents purchased an upright piano and helped provide occasional piano lessons when he was fourteen. His earliest known works date from this period, and he began to profit from his music around the same time; according to his adoptive sister Gisèle, he gave music lessons to his peers and played piano accompaniment for the ballet school in nearby Ahuntsic in his early teens. He also developed an interest in the organ, searching for various churches in the Pont-Viau neighbourhood where he could practice and perform. As he didn't receive much if any musical education from the Frères Maristae, he was almost entirely self taught. One of Vivier's schoolmates, Gilles Beauregard, recalled his fascination with playing and studying the works of Mozart, Tchaikovsky, Bartók and Schoenberg. Vivier is believed to have written a handful of songs for voice and piano, and several organ preludes before the age of twenty, nearly all of which have since been lost or destroyed. Vivier's friend Michel-Georges Brégent recalled a Bartók-inspired Prélude pour piano being written in 1967, but it was apparently destroyed by Vivier at a later time.

Despite being a devout Catholic himself, Vivier eventually decided an expected career in the church would be impossible given his prior expulsion; he worked various odd jobs to stay financially afloat after leaving the novitiate, with positions at a hardware store, an Eaton's, and a restaurant in the Laval area. In the fall of 1967, he was finally able to enroll at the Conservatoire de musique du Québec à Montréal (CMQM).

He studied piano with Irving Heller, harmony and counterpoint with Isabelle Delorme, fugue with Françoise Aubut-Pratte, and composition with Gilles Tremblay. Vivier was one of Tremblay's more enthusiastic and dedicated pupils, with Tremblay recalling, "He was eager to know. He was so eager to know that he was sometimes very tiring, because he would follow me in the corridors after the lessons and ask me questions." Tremblay, a pupil of Olivier Messiaen, refused to focus on specific historical periods and styles of music, believing the concept of music composition was all-encompassing. He analyzed contrasting genres with his students, including Gregorian chant, and the music of Johannes Sebastian Bach and Alban Berg. This unique outlook for the time inspired Vivier's future style in combining disparate influences. His Quatuor à cordes (1968), Ojikawa (1968) and Prolifération (1969, rev. 1976) are among the few works he completed at the conservatory. Tremblay would come to support and elevate Vivier's status as a serious composer, and developed a close friendship with him.

He began his first known romantic relationship in Montreal with a man named Dino Olivieri. A postcard from this period dedicated to Olivieri reads, "Perhaps, I love you very much..."

Career

Studies in Europe

In 1971, following studies with Gilles Tremblay, Vivier studied for three years in Europe, first with Paul Méfano at the Conservatoire de Paris, Gottfried Michael Koenig at the Institute for Sonology in Utrecht, and finally in Cologne with famous modernist composer Karlheinz Stockhausen. He had first heard Stockhausen's music after attending a 1968 concert of new music in Montreal, and was fascinated with the German composer's experimental approach to timbre. Vivier moved to Cologne hoping to take lessons with him, and was initially rejected. Stockhausen reportedly sight-read one of his manuscripts and exclaimed to his students, "Just look at this! Look at this writing! Would you accept somebody like this as a student? This man will never be a good composer, with writing like that!" He was rejected once more before being formally accepted in Stockhausen's Darmstadt courses for the first semester of 1972, studying additionally with professors Hans Ulrich Humpert and Richard Toop.

Vivier was strongly influenced by Stockhausen, and would often revere the composer as the greatest in music history. Stockhausen, however, did not initially think much of the enthusiastic Vivier. Toop once stated, "paradoxically, Stockhausen never seemed to take Claude as seriously as he took most of the other students." This did not deter Vivier, however, "Claude was by far Stockhausen's most loyal adherent in the class (in fact, I think of loyalty as one of Claude's key characteristics), and the only one to share Stockhausen's spiritual outlook to any significant degree." He also had a reputation among his classmates, often being teased and ridiculed for his disheveled, eccentric appearance and overt flamboyancy. In spite of this, Vivier did develop amicable relationships with some of his peers, including Gérard Grisey, fellow Québécois Walter Boudreau, and Horațiu Rădulescu. Vivier would end up performing as a percussionist in a Darmstadt production of Rădulescu's piece Flood for the Eternal's Origins (1970), described by the composer as being written for "global sound sources".

His early works have aspects that are derivative of his teacher, including radical approaches to serialism and the twelve-tone technique. Vivier differed from his teacher and contemporaries like Pierre Boulez, however, by continuing to use melody as the driving force of his compositions. He had also begun composing experimental electroacoustic music inspired by his first semester in Utrecht, all of which for tape. The first piece he wrote while under Stockhausen's tutelage was Chants (1973) for seven female voices, which he would describe as, "the first moment of my existence as a composer". Vivier became familiar with a precedent to the type of approach he would adopt in future compositions – the use of ring modulation. Stockhausen's Mantra (1970) for two pianos and electronics relates most strongly to Vivier's musical occupations.

Style shift
Between 1972 and 1973, Vivier dramatically shifted his musical language. He had come to reject twelve-tone music as "too restrictive" and began furthering his own unique style. He explored the possibilities of monody and homophony in his vocal works, and more confidently applied his  and multilingual texts. His works for larger ensembles like orchestras began to show the timbral influence of Arnold Schoenberg in his application of klangfarbenmelodie, and the lushly post-romantic expressivity of Gustav Mahler. Vivier once stated that Mahler was perhaps the musician who he had most in common with; Chopin and Mozart were two others he would relate himself to in terms of musical application.

Return to Canada

In 1974, Vivier returned to Montreal to begin establishing a career as a freelance composer in his home country after years of little to no recognition. He took a job as an organ teacher for a local school, Galipeau Musique, to pay for the rent of his new inner-city apartment, but would continue to struggle financially as he readjusted to life in Quebec. The Canadian Broadcasting Corporation (CBC) commissioned an orchestral piece from Vivier the same year, to be played by the National Youth Orchestra of Canada under Marius Constant. The resulting piece, Siddhartha (1976), was completed nearly two years later after many revisions. It was his most ambitious project up to that point, and as noted by György Ligeti, was his first foray into Asian music, specifically the raga. The Youth Orchestra contacted Vivier soon after receiving the score, saying the work was far too complex and technically difficult to be performed – it would remain unperformed until several years after his death.

He took up other professorial and pedagogical jobs during this time, including at the Collège Montmorency in Laval, the Université de Montréal, and the University of Ottawa. The composer would tell an interviewer that he was "not liked" at Montmorency, and was described by a peer to be "a catastrophe" of a teacher. Vivier's time at the University of Ottawa was considerably more rewarding; In 1975 he was placed in charge of the university's foremost contemporary ensemble, Atelier de musique contemporaine. His teaching contract lasted for the seven months from October 1975 to April 1976, and was paid hourly at a rate of approximately $20. He would frequently commute by bus from his apartment in Montreal to the music department in Ottawa.

Ethnomusicological journeys

From late 1976 to early 1977, Vivier spent some time travelling to Egypt, Japan, Iran, Thailand, Singapore and Bali to document the musicology of these regions. The differing musical cultures and traditions he encountered easily infiltrated his own compositional style; the most prominent change was his newfound fixation with more complex rhythms. His piano piece Shiraz (1977), named after the eponymous Iranian city, contains a flurry of interlocking rhythmic combinations and pulses at great speed. Vivier was inspired to write the piece after listening to two blind singers perform in the city's market square. He wrote in the piece's program notes how he found Shiraz to be, "a pearl of a city, a diamond vigorously cut". The visit to Singapore was described in his journal with the three words, "Bells: joy. ecstasy."

He visitied kabuki theatres in the Tokyo area and was struck by the ritual-like nature of both the music and physical performance. Zipangu (1980) was later written as a Japanese-infused work for string orchestra, with elements of South Indian Carnatic music (including dronal imitation of the tanbur, rhythmic tala, further raga manipulation and chalanata) – the name of the piece is taken from a former and antiquated exonym for Japan, roughly translated to mean "the land of sunrise". Zipangu is considered by many to be the composer's most aggressive and "unforgiving" piece, as it features a plethora of extended techniques for strings (i.e. snap pizzicato and bow overpressure) and denser harmonic content atop a complex melody, similar to the string compositions of Krzysztof Penderecki.

Bali was where he spent the most time, meticulously analyzing the traditional gamelan of the region, and attempting to learn their native language. Vivier kept an incredibly detailed notebook where he wrote everything he had learned from local villagers, including an anatomical chart with various body parts labelled in Balinese. He described his Bali trip as, "a lesson in love, in tenderness, in poetry and in respect for life". Ensemble pieces Pulau Dewata (1977) and Paramirabo (1978) are both directly influenced by the Balinese gamelan, with a modified form of kotekan (a method of rhythmic alternation akin to the European hocket) being used between two atonal melodies.

Vivier concluded his journey in Thailand in January 1977 and returned to Montreal, cutting the trip six months short of what he had initially anticipated. The reason why has been disputed, but he wrote to the Canada Council for the Arts that the trip had rendered him, "... exhausted, nervously and physically".

Burgeoning career

Working with Québécois pianist Lorraine Vaillancourt, composer John Rea, and Spanish expatriate José Evangelista at the Université de Montréal, he began a series of concerts featuring new performances of contemporary works entitled Les Événements du Neuf. He wrote some pieces for the Québec dance ensemble Le Groupe de la Palace Royale, including the ballets Love Songs and Nanti Malam (1977), both showing the Balinese influence he would continue to retain. Lonely Child (1980) was written as another commission from the CBC, this time with the Vancouver Symphony Orchestra under the direction of Serge Garant. Vivier's small-scale opera Kopernikus (1979) was premiered in its orchestral form on 8 May 1980 at the Théâtre du Monument National in Montreal, with Vaillancourt conducting the orchestra.

He briefly travelled to Europe in November of the same year to confer with the French spectral composers Gérard Grisey and Tristan Murail, the former of whom was an old friend of Vivier's from the Darmstadt school. They would together study, "spectral calculation[s] of the relationships between the bass note and the melodic note". Spectral music would later become the main thesis of Vivier's last compositions. He would label his spectralist techniques as jeux de couleurs ("play of colours"), a blending of harmony and orchestral timbre that rises above a fundamental two-voiced texture; very much inspired by the exploratory works of Grisey, such as Partiels (1975). Jeux de couleurs arose from Vivier's preoccupation with the vertical manifestation of melody, and how various instruments of the orchestra could be used to replicate specific tone colours through the harmonic series. This is a considerable departure from the principles of klangfarbenmelodie, as Vivier began to use frequency modulation and other intervallic algorithms to reach notes beyond 12-tone equal temperament. In his scores, he often writes out the tuning in cents to precisely map out the frequencies for performers. In a letter addressed to Grisey, shortly before his death, Vivier writes, "I'm also composing with spectra now. You've influenced me... only I twist mine a little!"

The Canadian Music Centre, of which he had been a member, named him "Composer of the Year" in 1981, for continuously endorsing and contributing to the contemporary musical language of Canada.

Later life and death

Final move

In June 1982, Vivier decided to temporarily relocate to Paris, believing he had exhausted all the orchestras and ensembles he could possibly be commissioned from in Canada. Despite troubled financial circumstances, Vivier was confident and pleased to be in the city; spending the majority of his days composing, first working on Trois airs pour un opéra imaginaire (1982). A few months later, he began a short but passionate relationship with an American author and expatriate Christopher Coe. The relationship ended on 24 January 1983, when Vivier found out Coe had another boyfriend in New York City. It was one of Vivier's only serious relationships. Coe would later write a novel depicting a fictionalised account of their love affair, entitled Such Times.

First attack
On the evening of 25 January, the day after severing his relationship with Coe, Vivier picked up an unknown man at a Parisian gay bar and brought him back to his apartment for sexual favours. Before anything was to happen, the man suddenly "grew violent" and attacked Vivier with a pair of scissors, slashing his face and neck, resulting in many superficial wounds. Before the assailant made off with the contents of his wallet, he cut Vivier's phone line with the same scissors. Vivier rushed to his friend, Philippe Poloni, who was staying in an apartment complex not far from his. He recalled in a letter sent the morning after, "Philippe has been marvelous with me – I cried in his arms – he was incredibly tender with me – we talked a little, he looked after me and he also took care of this wound in my being which touched my soul to its depths." Poloni helped recompose Vivier, but warned him of the many  in the area who could trick him into being robbed again.

The incident profoundly affected Vivier and made him significantly more paranoid and self-conscious, "I'm afraid, afraid of myself, I'm afraid of failing in my task – I'm so stupid, so weak, so incapable of living my creative solitude fully and that is what I have to force myself to do." Despite this, however, he continued to peruse other gay bars in the area, to the frustration and worry of friends who feared another attack would happen.

Death
On the evening of Monday, 7 March 1983, Vivier was drinking at a different bar in the Belleville neighbourhood and invited a young man, twenty-year-old Pascal Dolzan, to spend the night at his place. The circumstances of what exactly happened that night and early the following morning is still under speculation, but Dolzan would later relay that he only accepted Vivier's invitation with the intention of robbing and killing him. The exact time in which he did so is unknown.

On Tuesday, Vivier was scheduled to give a midday lecture with Belgian musicologist Harry Halbreich on the music of Quebec, at the Conservatoire de Paris. After not showing up, Halbreich immediately suspected something to be wrong, "I became worried very quickly, because by nature he was absolutely punctual and precise about work-related matters. I called his place all afternoon but there was no reply, and in the evening, when I gave the talk, alone, alas, I knew something serious had happened." Vivier was known to lock himself away for weeks at a time when working on music, but he had never missed any of his scheduled meetings without informing anyone prior. Halbreich contacted his sister Janine Halbreich-Euvrard, who was residing close to Vivier's place, to check on him. She found his apartment door locked, and received no response when knocking repeatedly. Halbreich relates, "I had to leave for Brussels, and I asked my sister to inform the police. That Saturday my sister telephoned me, in tears, and told me that they had found him."

Vivier's body was discovered after Paris police entered his ransacked apartment on Saturday, 12 March, and noticed blood pooled beneath and beside his bed. He was found stuffed between two mattresses, having been beaten, strangled, suffocated, and stabbed with a large dagger at least forty-five times, rendering him nearly unrecognizable. He was stabbed with such force that the dagger penetrated the mattress in several areas and left blood spatter on the walls and ceiling. First responders initially suspected two or more men to be responsible, given the extended state of havoc Vivier's body and home had been left in.

Dolzan was considered the prime suspect, and was arrested nearly eight months later on 26 October, at a pub in Place de Clichy. He confessed to Vivier's murder, stating he strangled the composer with a dog collar and jammed a white handkerchief in his mouth to silence his screams. The only thing Dolzan ended up taking before leaving and locking the apartment door were a few thousand francs he found in Vivier's wallet. It was eventually discovered by the police that Dolzan was a homeless serial criminal who had assaulted other gay men in Paris prior to Vivier's murder. His modus operandi was to enter gay bars – despite not being gay himself — and seduce men with the intent of stealing their valuables and maliciously harming them, similar to other  who committed their crimes in Paris. Dolzan is confirmed to have assaulted several men and killed two others in this way, mostly in the area encompassing The Marais (currently home to France's largest gay village). The true number of victims is possibly higher.

During Dolzan's subsequent trial, the court came to the conclusion that Vivier and his other victims were robbed, assaulted and murdered as the result of a series of drug-fueled hate crimes. He was charged for and found guilty of all three confirmed killings by Paris's cour d'assises and given the maximum possible sentence of life imprisonment in November 1986. Dolzan was later transferred from the Penitentiary Centre in southern Lannemezan to a higher security prison in 1991, after engaging in a series of violent protests within the penitentiary.

Funeral and reactions

As Vivier left behind no will, it was ultimately decided by Paris authorities to cremate his remains on 23 March 1983, as his body had been too bludgeoned and decomposed for morgue workers to embalm him. He was cremated at the Père Lachaise Crematorium, and his ashes were transported to Montreal for burial. A small ceremony was held in Paris on the same day, with his remains being substituted by a small wooden box in an improvised casket. Many of his friends and musical contemporaries were in attendance, including Grisey and Murail.

A proper funeral was held in Église Saint-Albert-le-Grand du Montréal on 14 April, what would have been Vivier's thirty-fifth birthday. The music performed there included the psalm setting from Ojikawa (1968), one of the earliest works in his catalogue. His ashes were placed in Laval's Salon Funéraire Dallaire. An official memorial concert followed on 2 June in the auditorium of Salle Claude Champagne, with performances of pieces including Prolifération (1969), Pianoforte (1975), Shiraz (1977) and Lonely Child (1980).

As news of his death spread throughout France and his native Québec, many of Vivier's colleagues and former teachers were shocked. Gilles Tremblay would say he was, "completely surprised" and, "... when he died we were very sad. But in a certain way I was furious. I was furious against him. You know, you don't have the right, when you have such talent, to be so stupid!" Some would question if he had any motive or incentive to have himself killed, especially as the composer was chronically depressed and known to have a fascination with death. Harry Halbreich would say after Vivier was attacked in January, "... we begged him to move, but he ignored these warnings, driven by who knows what horrible fascination with the darkness that he was so afraid of". Vivier's close friends Thérèse Desjardins and José Evangelista, conductor Vladimir Jurowski and others would suggest he had intentionally arranged his own death. There is no concrete evidence to suggest this, however.

Personal life

Overview

Vivier was best known among his friends and acquaintances for his extroverted personality, effeminate mannerisms, and distinctive laugh, described by some as being similar to the cackle of a hyena; or, "very loud and a bit creepy". He similarly had the tendency to blurt and shout out various phrases and expletives seemingly at random, with some speculating he had a form of Tourette's syndrome. The more notable of these incidents include him screaming, "I am a bastard!" in the middle of a lunch with his teacher Gilles Tremblay, and him repeatedly yelling, "shit!" in Gottfried Koenig's classroom.

Especially as his career was beginning, Vivier was recalled by many to have had incredibly poor hygiene. He was noted for wearing the same shearling coat nearly every day of his adult life, and growing out his greasy, long and unkempt hair. One acquaintance recalled how horrible and sheep-like he smelled, much to the bother of his classmates and teachers, including Stockhausen.

Vivier had various anxiety disorders and extreme nyctophobia; which would manifest in his adulthood as oftentimes giving himself a curfew before night fell, and regularly leaving a bedroom light on when going to sleep. It's unknown how exactly he developed this fear, but biographer Bob Gilmore posits that it originated in his childhood. Vivier would reference his nyctophobia in Lonely Child (1980), with the line, "Don't leave me in the dark, you know I'm afraid."

Sexuality and identity
Vivier was openly gay, and many of his compositions — as well as poems written in his teenage years — reflect progressive and homosexual themes. He would comment on, "all the extreme feminist thought, ultimately, that I have. A sensitivity that I have, very feminist, or gay, or, finally, a thinking that goes a little beyond the usual modes that are male/female, dominating/dominated, ... I stay very intimate, my music is very intimate." In the last few months of his life, he had begun working on an opera entitled Tchaïkovski, un réquiem Russe, which would have advanced the theory that famous romantic composer Pyotr Ilyich Tchaikovsky was ordered to commit suicide upon the revelation of his sexual preferences. He announced the project to UNESCO music organisations and consulted Harry Halbreich for help with the libretto, but very little was completed in manuscript form and the opera was never staged.

Friends and subsequent historians would comment on how Vivier led a somewhat bohemian lifestyle — he had numerous lovers and homoerotic affairs throughout his life, with the only ones of confirmed identity being Dani Olivieri and Christopher Coe. Vivier was especially attracted to the stereotypically muscular, leather-clad biker. He was known to have been interested in the lifestyles and theatrics of the Hells Angels motorcycle gang, and once wrote of his sadomasochist bent to a friend, "Violence is fascinating, erotic also. You can go each time one step further." He would say in an interview with Quebec LGBT magazine Le Berdache, "I no longer feel sorry for the fact that I am a faggot," reflecting the previous struggles and newfound confidence in accepting his sexuality.

It's believed that Vivier was a carrier of the HIV virus at the time of his death, as Christopher Coe had tested positive for AIDS in the early 1980s, around the time the two were dating. Philippe Poloni would say years later, "I think if Claude didn't die [of murder] he would have died of AIDS. I think his path was going that way." Coe himself died from AIDS-related complications in 1994.

Ethnicity
Despite having no evidence to suggest Vivier was ethnically Jewish, he would maintain throughout his life that he was — an experience with a ouija board in Montreal would cement this belief, "the 'oracle' call[ed] out (in answer to Vivier's question 'who am I?') the name 'Jew' ". After the 1982 Chez Jo Goldenberg restaurant attack, an antisemitic mass murder which occurred less than five kilometres from where Vivier was staying in Paris, he had begun to fear he would fall victim to a racially motivated hate crime. He wrote in a letter to Desjardins, "I've never before experienced racism and its animality so deeply in my skin," referring to the racism in France he perceived at the time.

Music

Overview

Vivier is believed to have only forty-eight surviving compositions completed before his death. They vary in ensemble from choral works, chamber pieces, experimental tape music, large-scale opera and otherwise. Vivier's musical style would shift consistently throughout his career; he was once an advocator of serialism, which had taken a hold on much of Europe's composers in the mid to late 20th century, but would abandon it and come to resent its popularity in later years: 

Vivier is considered to be one of the founders of spectral music, and is placed among the early group of pioneers referred to as the "German Feedback" group, alongside fellow composers and Stockhausen pupils including Péter Eötvös and Clarence Barlow. Parallels between Vivier's compositional style and that of Olivier Messiaen have been noted, especially regarding the use of dense chords in homophonic textures and use of east Asian instrumentation, such as tuned nipple gongs and gamelan-adjacent keyboards and melodic idiophones. He is considered one of the most important alumni of the Darmstadt school, in terms of his contribution to the postmodernist trend that flourished after his death. Some musicologists, however, classify Vivier as a postmodernist composer in his own right, who wrote some of the first and most consequential pieces of this era.

Many of his works center around important themes of Christianity, including the chamber pieces Jesus erbarme dich (1973), Liebesgedichte (1975) and Les Communiantes (1977). Despite resenting much of his strict religious upbringing, he continued to maintain a strong spiritual disposition, still believing in God while having no allegiance to any specific denomination.

Application of language and multilingualism

The study of linguistics fascinated Vivier from a young age, and many languages are used in the texts and librettos of his vocal pieces, oftentimes juxtaposed on top of one another. He was a polyglot who would learn multiple languages at the same time — he is known to have been completely fluent in French, German and English, but he also took extended notes and studies on Greek, Latin, Italian, Balinese, Malay, Japanese, and more. The degree to how educated and conversational he was in the latter languages is not fully known.

Several examples of multilingual texts are present in Vivier's music. Chants (1973) predominately features a Latin text, which is sometimes manipulated in the form of being spoken backwards. The lexicons of other languages, including Polish (mamouchka for "mother") are also present. The similarly Latin text from Virgil's Eclogues, alongside many other quotations, is used in Liebesgedichte (1975). The latter half of Glaubst du an die Unsterblichkeit der Seele? (1983) features the male narrator reciting a combined text of French and English.

The langue inventées
Vivier first recalled his tendency to create new languages as a child, saying his lack of identity and parents led him to, "[fabricate] my origins as I wanted, pretended to speak strange languages. [...] My whole sensibility became refined and increasingly I drew a veil around myself: finally I was protected!" The first example of this technique being used is in his piece Ojikawa (1968), albeit with a string of nonsense-words (e.g. "Niêdokawa ojikawa na'a'a'ouvina ouvi") strung together by the vocalist — similar to the sound poetry and grammelot of dadaists like Hugo Ball and Christian Morgenstern. Liebesgedichte (1975) follows a similar motif, but the text becomes more uniform and the basics of a functioning language begin to form, including repetition and a phonetic inventory. He attempted to learn the official languages of all the countries he visited, and the influence of these languages, mostly of Asian origin, show up in the sound of his own. Vivier would say, "All this language is the result of automatic writing. I have always invented my own language."

The specific phonemes Vivier would use were deliberately chosen for their "emotional content", and how they related to the frequency of the note being sung by the vocalist. He used a modified Latin script with diacritics to write out these sounds, but would occasionally borrow glyphs from other writing systems, including Cyrillic. Most of the langue inventées''' words consist of a single syllable; multisyllablic words are often intentionally hyphenated in the manuscript.

Reception

CBC Radio host and composer David Jaegar would say, "Vivier was brilliant enough to comprehend all of the theory, but he never let the theory stand in the way of self-expression. His was a unique voice that had both complexity and clarity." His friend Harry Halbreich wrote, "His music is truly unlike any other, and is situated completely on the fringes of all currents. From an expression direct and moving, his music only disoriented dry hearts, unable to classify this marginal genius. Claude Vivier had found what so many others searched and searched: the secret of a real new simplicity."

Modernist composers Louis Andriessen and György Ligeti are among those who have cited Vivier as a great inspiration to their own music; Ligeti would later dedicate his time to championing Vivier's catalogue posthumously, saying, "His music is one of the most significant, perhaps even one of the most important developments since the works of Stravinsky and Messiaen," and, "He was neither neo, nor retro, but at the same time was totally outside the avant-garde. It is in the seduction and sensuality of the complex timbres that he reveals himself to be the great master that he is."

Legacy and tributes
Vivier's close friend Thérèse Desjardins was designated the curator of much of his belongings and artifacts, and subsequently founded Les Amis de Claude Vivier (lit. "The Friends of Claude Vivier"; later renamed to Fondation Vivier), an organization dedicated to promoting his music and biographical details. His original manuscripts and incomplete sketches were donated by Desjardins to the Université de Montréal, where they are currently housed.

Former CMQM classmate and experimental composer Walter Boudreau would conduct the premieres of Siddhartha (1975) and Glaubst du an die Unsterblichkeit der Seele? (1983) in 1987 and 1990 respectively, with various Montreal-based orchestras and chamber ensembles. The London Contemporary Orchestra performed a special concert for Glaubst in an abandoned London tube station in 2013, to mimic the theme of the composition.Morrison, Richard (2013). "Late composer Claude Vivier goes underground". The Times. Retrieved 25 July 2022.

In 2005, Serbian-German composer Marko Nikodijević wrote the ensemble piece chambres de ténèbres / tombeau de claude vivier in remembrance of the composer. He would later write and premiere the 2014 opera Vivier at the Munich Biennale, to a libretto by Gunther Geltinger. It is mostly biographical and focuses on the last few years of his life.

The Société de musique contemporaine du Québec (SMCQ) commissioned the graphic novelist Zviane in 2007 to write a work on Vivier as part of their "Tribute" series, on the twenty-fifth anniversary of the composer's death. Zviane, working with cowriter Martine Rhéaume, published Des étoiles dans les oreilles (lit. "The Stars in the Ears") the same year. The inner sleeve, written by Zviane, says, "Vivier. Claude Vivier. As we say Mozart. Wolfgang Amadeus Mozart... Isn't it normal to recognize our own heroes? If music is a fundamental expression of humanity, then Claude Vivier knew how to express the quintessence of [Quebec] culture, our history, our dreams. Vivier is a real 'national treasure'."

Lists of works
Complete list of musical works
In chronological order:L'homme (1967; lost) for organPrélude pour piano (1967; lost) for pianoInvention sur un thème pentatonique (1967; unfinished) for organQuatuor à cordes (1968) for string quartetOjikawa (1968) for soprano, clarinet and timpaniMusique pour une liberté à bâtir (1968–69) for women's voices and orchestraProlifération (1969, rev. 1976) for ondes Martenot, piano and percussionHiérophanie (1970–71) for soprano and ensembleMusik für das Ende (1971) for twenty voices and percussionDeva et Asura (1971–72) for chamber orchestraVariation I (1972) for tape
[untitled] (1972) for tapeHommage: Musique pour un vieux Corse triste (1972) for tapeDésintégration (1972) for two pianos and optional tapeChants (1973) for seven female voicesO! Kosmos (1973) for soprano and SATB choirJesus erbarme dich (1973) for soprano and choirLettura di Dante (1974) for soprano and mixed septetHymnen an die nacht (1975) for soprano and pianoLiebesgedichte (1975) for four voices and ensemblePièce pour flûte et piano (1975) for flute and pianoPièce pour violon et clarinette (1975) for violin and clarinetPièce pour violon et piano (1975) for violin and pianoPièce pour violoncelle et piano (1975) for cello and pianoPour guitare (1975) for guitarPianoforte (1975) for pianoImprovisation pour basson et piano (1975) for bassoon and pianoSiddhartha (1976) for orchestraWoyzeck (1976) for tapeLearning (1976) for four violins and percussionJournal (1977) for four voices, choir and percussionLove Songs (1977) ballet for seven vocalistsPulau Dewata (1977) for any combination of instrumentsShiraz (1977) for pianoLes Communiantes (1977) for organNanti Malam (1977) for seven voicesParamirabo (1978) for flute, violin, cello and pianoGreeting Music (1978) for flute, oboe, percussion, piano and violoncelloKopernikus (1979), an opera in two actsOrion (1979) for orchestraAikea (1980) for three percussionistsZipangu (1980) for string orchestraLonely Child (1980) for soprano and orchestraCinq chansons pour percussion (1980) for solo percussionistBouchara (1981) for soprano and chamber ensembleEt je reverrai cette ville étrange (1981) for chamber ensembleA Little Joke (1981) for SATB choirSamarkand (1981) for wind quintet and pianoWo bist du Licht! (1981) for mezzo-soprano, orchestra and tapeTrois airs pour un opéra imaginaire (1982) for soprano and ensembleRêves d'un Marco Polo (1981–83; unfinished) for choir, narrator and chamber ensembleGlaubst du an die Unsterblichkeit der Seele? (1983; unfinished) for choir, narrator and chamber ensembleTchaïkovski, un réquiem Russe (1983; unfinished), opera

Complete list of published poems
In chronological order:Musique (1964–65)En musicant (1964–65)L'Amour (1965)Serge Bélisle (1965)Noël (1965)Postulat (1965)Not' petit bonheur (1965)Le clown (1965–66)

See also
List of LGBT classical composers
Canadian classical music

Footnotes

References
Citations

Sources

 
 
 
 
 
 
 
 
 
 
 
 
 
 
 
 
 
 
 
 
 
 
 

Further reading

 
 
 
 
 
 Bisson, Sophie (2019). "Claude Vivier's Kopernikus: An Extramusical Postmortem". The WholeNote. Retrieved 2 August 2022.
 Bonfield, Stephan (2017). "Review: Vivier's Kopernikus at Banff Centre the ideal opera of the future". Calgary Herald. Retrieved 25 July 2022.
 
 
 Bratishenko, Lev (2013). "Review: Claude Vivier venerated at festival". The Montreal Gazette. Retrieved 31 July 2022.
 
 
 Condé, Gérard (1983). "Créations a l'Itinéraire: Les mélodies de Claude Vivier". Le Monde. Retrieved 2 August 2022.
 
 
 
 
 Dunning, Jennifer (1977). "Dance: Montrealers Try All Arts." The New York Times. Retrieved 26 July 2022.
 Gervasoni, Pierre (2018). "Claude Vivier, bien plus qu'un marginal illuminé". Le Monde. Retrieved 25 July 2022.
 Gougeon, Denis; de la Clergerie, Catherine; Bernard, Marie-Hélène (1991). "Claude Vivier ou la Montée au ciel de l'Homme qui riait toujours". France Culture.
 Grundy, David (2022). "Child of Light: The musical otherworlds of Claude Vivier". Artforum. Retrieved 26 July 2022.
 
 Hall, Lawton (2020). "Claude Viver's 'Couleurs': Generating Pitch Structures Through Ring Modulation". Lawton Hall. Retrieved 26 July 2022.
 Kaptainis, Arthur (2014). "Classical music review: Claude Vivier's Hiérophanie is madness at its best". Montreal Gazette. Retrieved 31 July 2022.
 Kaptainis, Arthur (2015). "Arthur Kaptainis: Excellent biography of composer Claude Vivier is long overdue". Montreal Gazette. Retrieved 25 July 2022.
 
 
 Kosmicki, Guillaume (2021). "Cinq œuvres phares de Claude Vivier". ResMusica. Retrieved 25 July 2022.
 
 
 
 Machart, Renaud (1996). "Le Festival d'automne et un disque « ressuscitent » la musique de Claude Vivier". Le Monde. Retrieved 2 August 2022.
 
 Mijnheer, Jaco (2001). "Vivier, Claude". The New Grove Dictionary of Music and Musicians, 2nd edition, edited by Stanley Sadie and John Tyrrell. London: Macmillan.
 
 
 Porte, Sebastian (2018). "Claude Vivier, une œuvre hantée par l'enfance et la mort". Télérama. Retrieved 25 July 2022.
 Potvin, Gilles (1980). "Kopernikus: un coup d'audace de Claude Vivier." Le Devoir.
 Rabinowitz, Chloe (2022). "Soundstreams to Return to The Stage With a Love Song to Toronto". Broadway World Toronto. Retrieved 31 July 2022.
 
 Renzetti, Elizabeth (2008). "New project is bringing Vivier to the world". The Globe and Mail. Retrieved 2 August 2022.
 
 
 Simeonov, Jenna (2019). "Against the Grain Theatre's production of Kopernikus is a true operatic ritual". The Globe and Mail. Retrieved 2 August 2022.
 
 
 
 
 Thomson, Daniel (2017). "A murdered composer, a lost libretto... could this be Canada's greatest opera?". Canadian Broadcasting Corporation. Retrieved 25 July 2022.
 
 
 
 
 
 

External links

Information and catalogues
 ; contains list of works and biographical information
 Claude Vivier in the National Arts Centre of Canada
 Claude Vivier in The Canadian Encyclopedia Claude Vivier on the SMCQ website
 Claude Vivier in Boosey & Hawkes Claude Vivier in Kairos Records Claude Vivier in Naxos Records 
 
 
 

Media
 Lonely Child: The Imaginary World of Claude Vivier (1988) on IMDb; a biographical depiction of Vivier's life and musical performances funded by the Canadian government.
 Claude Vivier: Rêves d'un Marco Polo (2006) on IMDb; an English stage production of Vivier's unfinished cantata of the same name.
 ; a short 2017 biographical documentary by American composer Thomas Little.
 ; a November 2012 segment from the BBC Radio 3's "Fifty Modern Classics" program. Includes interviews with soprano Barbara Hannigan and music critic Paul Griffiths.
 Claude Vivier and the Immortality of the Soul; a November 2014 Public Radio Exchange'' biopic of Vivier by Byrwec Ellison.

Listening
 
 
 
 
 
 
 

1948 births
1983 deaths
1980s murders in Paris
1983 murders in France
20th-century Canadian composers
20th-century Canadian keyboardists
20th-century Canadian male musicians
20th-century Canadian male writers
20th-century Canadian pianists
20th-century Canadian poets
20th-century classical composers
20th-century classical pianists
20th-century Canadian LGBT people
20th-century male pianists
20th-century musicologists
20th-century organists
Avant-garde composers
Ballet composers
Canadian adoptees
Canadian arts administrators
Canadian classical composers
Canadian contemporary classical composers
Canadian electronic musicians
Canadian ethnomusicologists
Canadian gay musicians
Canadian gay writers
Canadian librettists
Canadian male classical composers
Canadian male composers
Canadian male pianists
Canadian male poets
Canadian male songwriters
Canadian modernist poets
Canadian murder victims
Canadian music educators
Canadian opera composers
Canadian people murdered abroad
Canadian people with disabilities
Canadian poets in French
Canadian Roman Catholics
Canadian schoolteachers
Canadian LGBT poets
Canadian LGBT songwriters
Canadian victims of anti-LGBT hate crimes
Child sexual abuse in Canada
Choral composers
Classical accompanists
Composers for cello
Composers for clarinet
Composers for the classical guitar
Composers for flute
Composers for pipe organ
Composers for piano
Composers for viola
Composers for violin
Conservatoire de musique du Québec à Montréal alumni
Constructed language creators
Contemporary classical music performers
Contemporary classical composers
Dada
Electroacoustic music composers
Experimental composers
Francophone Quebec people
French murder victims
Gamelan musicians
Gay academics
Canadian gay artists
Gay feminists
Gay male erotica artists
Gay composers
Gay songwriters
Gay poets
Humor in classical music
Incidents of violence against boys
Just intonation composers
Lecturers
LGBT choreographers
LGBT classical composers
LGBT classical musicians
LGBT history in Canada
Canadian LGBT rights activists
Lyric poets
Male classical organists
Male murder victims
Male opera composers
Microtonal composers
Microtonal musicians
Modernist composers
Multilingual poets
Multilingual writers
Music theorists
Musicians from Montreal
Ondists
Opera librettists
Organ improvisers
Outsider musicians
People murdered in Paris
People with HIV/AIDS
Pupils of Karlheinz Stockhausen
Rape in Canada
Rape of males
Songwriters from Quebec
Spectral music
String quartet composers
Twelve-tone and serial composers
Academic staff of the Université de Montréal
Victims of anti-LGBT hate crimes
Violence against children
Violence against gay men
Violence against LGBT people
Violence against LGBT people in Europe
Violence against men in Europe
Violence against men in North America
Writers from Montreal
Canadian LGBT academics